Ses Salines is a small municipality in the south of Majorca, one of the Balearic Islands, Spain.

References

Municipalities in Mallorca
Populated places in Mallorca